Jean's Plan is a 1946 British family crime film directed by A.C. Hammond and starring Billie Brooks, Gerald Case and Lyn Evans.

Plot summary
The daughter of a jeweller attempts to stop her father being robbed.

Cast
 Billie Brooks - Elsie Higgs
 Gerald Case - Inspector of Police
 Lyn Evans - Mr. Higgs
 Stanley Martin - Police car driver
 Geoffrey Morris - Squire
 Vivian Pickles - Jean Fairfax
 Jimmy Rhodes - Harry
 Maurice Rhodes - Boy with dog
 Edward V. Robson - Mr. Fairfax
 Alan Tilvern - Max
 Anthony Verney - Police orderly

References

External links

1946 films
1946 crime films
British black-and-white films
British crime films
1940s English-language films
1940s British films